Sparta is a collaborative album by M.O.P. and production team Snowgoons released on November 22, 2011, on Babygrande Records. The album is entirely produced by the Snowgoons.

Track listing

Charts

References

2011 albums
Babygrande Records albums